La Murga is a 1963 Argentine drama film directed by René Múgica. It stars Gilda Lousek, Alberto Argibay, Santiago Gómez Cou and Elena Lucena. Similar to the French New Wave films, La Murga deals with "urban angst", centred on conventillo dwellers. The film was shot in 1961 but wasn't released until 1963.

Cast
 Pola Alonso 
 Juan Carlos Altavista 
 Alberto Argibay 
 Camilo Da Passano 
 Jorge De La Riestra 
 Horacio Gallo 
 Josefa Goldar 
 Santiago Gómez Cou 
 Bernardo Kullock 
 Gilda Lousek 
 Elena Lucena 
 Luis Mottura 
 Carlos Olivieri 
 María Esther Podestá
 Julián Pérez Ávila

References

External links
 

1963 films
Argentine black-and-white films
1960s Spanish-language films
Films directed by René Múgica
1960s Argentine films